Mihajlo Vujačić (Cyrillic: Михајло Вујачић; born 8 April 1973) is a Montenegrin football manager and former player.

Club career
During his career he played as forward for FK Budućnost Podgorica, FK Železnik, FK Radnički Niš, FK Obilić, FK Srem, Greek Apollon Kalamarias F.C. and Cypriot Alki Larnaca FC.

References

External links
 Profile and stats at Srbijafudbal
 

1973 births
Living people
Footballers from Podgorica
Association football forwards
Serbia and Montenegro footballers
Montenegrin footballers
FK Budućnost Podgorica players
FK Železnik players
Apollon Pontou FC players
FK Radnički Niš players
FK Obilić players
Alki Larnaca FC players
FK Srem players
First League of Serbia and Montenegro players
Football League (Greece) players
Cypriot First Division players
Second League of Serbia and Montenegro players
Serbia and Montenegro expatriate footballers
Expatriate footballers in Greece
Serbia and Montenegro expatriate sportspeople in Greece
Expatriate footballers in Cyprus
Serbia and Montenegro expatriate sportspeople in Cyprus
Montenegrin football managers